The 1998 NCAA Division I Women's Lacrosse Championship was the 17th annual single-elimination tournament to determine the national champion of Division I NCAA women's college lacrosse. The championship game was played at UMBC Stadium in Catonsville, Maryland during May 1998. All NCAA Division I women's lacrosse programs were eligible for this championship. This year, the tournament field expanded from 8 to 12 teams, the second consecutive expansion after increasing from 6 to 8 teams the previous year.

Maryland defeated Virginia, 11–5, to win their sixth and fourth consecutive, national championship. This would subsequently become the fourth of Maryland's record seven straight national titles (1995–2001). 

The leading scorer for the tournament, with 15 goals, was Cathy Nelson from Maryland. Nelson was also the recipient of the Most Outstanding Player award, given out for the first time since 1984.

Teams

Tournament bracket

Tournament outstanding players 
Kate Graw, Dartmouth
Jacque Weitzel, Dartmouth
Alex Kahoe, Maryland
Kathleen Lund, Maryland
Cathy Nelson, Maryland (Most outstanding player)
Sascha Newmarch, Maryland
Kristin Sommar, Maryland
Sarah Dacey, North Carolina
Aubrey Falk, North Carolina
Kara Ariza, Virginia
Peggy Boutilier, Virginia
Melissa Hayes, Virginia

See also
1998 NCAA Division I Men's Lacrosse Championship
1998 NCAA Division II Lacrosse Championship
1998 NCAA Division III Women's Lacrosse Championship

References

NCAA Division I Women's Lacrosse Championship
NCAA Division I Women's Lacrosse Championship
NCAA Women's Lacrosse Championship
NCAA Division I Women's Lacrosse Championship